The English suffixes -phobia, -phobic, -phobe (from Greek φόβος phobos, "fear") occur in technical usage in psychiatry to construct words that describe irrational, abnormal, unwarranted, persistent, or disabling fear as a mental disorder (e.g. agoraphobia), in chemistry to describe chemical aversions (e.g. hydrophobic), in biology to describe organisms that dislike certain conditions (e.g. acidophobia), and in medicine to describe hypersensitivity to a stimulus, usually sensory (e.g. photophobia). In common usage, they also form words that describe dislike or hatred of a particular thing or subject (e.g. homophobia). The suffix is antonymic to -phil-.

For more information on the psychiatric side, including how psychiatry groups phobias such as agoraphobia, social phobia, or simple phobia, see phobia. The following lists include words ending in -phobia, and include fears that have acquired names. In some cases, the naming of phobias has become a word game, of notable example being a 1998 humorous article published by BBC News. In some cases, a word ending in -phobia may have an antonym with the suffix -phil-, e.g. Germanophobe/Germanophile.

Many -phobia lists circulate on the Internet, with words collected from indiscriminate sources, often copying each other. Also, a number of psychiatric websites exist that at the first glance cover a huge number of phobias, but in fact use a standard text to fit any phobia and reuse it for all unusual phobias by merely changing the name. Sometimes it leads to bizarre results, such as suggestions to cure "prostitute phobia". Such practice is known as content spamming and is used to attract search engines.

An article published in 1897 in American Journal of Psychology noted "the absurd tendency to give Greek names to objects feared (which, as Arndt says, would give us such terms as klopsophobia – fear of thieves,  – fear of the number 13....)".



Psychological conditions 
Specialists may prefer to avoid the suffix -phobia and use more descriptive terms such as personality disorders, anxiety disorders, and avoidant personality disorder. Terms should strictly have a Greek prefix although many are irregularly formed with Latin or even English prefixes. Many use inaccurate or imprecise prefixes, such as aerophobia (fear of air) for fear of flying.

A

B

C

D

E

F

G

H

I

K

L

M

N

O

P

R

S

T

V

W

X

Z

Cultural prejudices and discrimination

Ethnic prejudices and discrimination
The suffix -phobia is used to coin terms that denote a particular anti-ethnic or anti-demographic sentiment, such as Americanophobia, Europhobia, Francophobia, Hispanophobia, and Indophobia. Often a synonym with the prefix "anti-" already exists (e.g. Polonophobia vs. anti-Polonism). Anti-religious sentiments are expressed in terms such as Christianophobia and Islamophobia.

Medical conditions

Cultural phenomena

-phobia in the natural sciences 
In the natural sciences, words with the suffix -phobia/-phobic generally describe a predisposition for avoidance and/or exclusion. For antonyms, see here

Jocular and fictional phobias 
 Aibohphobia – a humorous term for the fear of palindromes, which is a palindrome itself. The term is a piece of computer humor entered into the 1981 The Devil's DP Dictionary.
 Anatidaephobia – the fictional fear that one is being watched by a duck. The word comes from the name of the family Anatidae, and was used in Gary Larson's The Far Side.
 Anoraknophobia – a portmanteau of "anorak" and "arachnophobia". It was used in the Wallace and Gromit comic book Anoraknophobia. Also the title of an album by Marillion.
 Arachibutyrophobia – fear of peanut butter sticking to the roof of the mouth, from Latin  "peanut" and  "butter". The word is used by Charles M. Schulz in a 1982 installment of his Peanuts comic strip, and by Peter O'Donnell in his 1985 Modesty Blaise adventure novel Dead Man's Handle.
 Charlophobia – the fictional fear of any person named Charlotte or Charlie, mentioned in the comedic book A Duck is Watching Me: Strange and Unusual Phobias (2014), by Bernie Hobbs. The phobia was created to mock name bias, a form of discrimination studied by researchers at the University of California, Berkeley and the University of Chicago.
 Hippopotomonstrosesquipedaliophobia – fear of long words, from the root word  combined with monstrum and hippopotamus. This was mentioned on the first episode of Brainiac Series Five as a Tickle's Teaser.
 Keanuphobia – fear of Keanu Reeves, portrayed in the Dean Koontz book, False Memory, where a woman has an irrational fear of Reeves and has to see her psychiatrist, Mark Ahriman, each week, unaware that she only has the fear in the first place because Ahriman implanted it via hypnotic suggestion to amuse himself. He calls her "Keanuphobe" in his head.
 Nihilophobia – fear of nothingness, from Latin nihil and "nothing, none", as described by the Doctor in the Star Trek: Voyager episode "Night". Voyager's morale officer and chef Neelix has this condition, having panic attacks while the ship was traversing a dark expanse of space known as the Void. It is also the title of a 2008 album by Neuronium.
 Robophobia – irrational fear of robots and/or androids, also known as "Grimwade's Syndrome". It was first used in "The Robots of Death", the fifth serial of the 14th season of the British science fiction television series Doctor Who.
 Semaphobia – fear of average web developers to use Semantic Web technologies.
 Venustraphobia – fear of beautiful women, according to a 1998 humorous article published by BBC News. Venustraphobia is also the title of a 2006 album by Casbah Club.

See also 
 List of paraphilias
 List of manias
 Childhood phobia
 Specific phobia

References

Further reading

External links 

 The Phobia List
 Nursing Degree Guide

 List of phobias
Medical lists
Psychology lists
Lists of words